Vaikhawtlang is a remote village in Champhai district, Mizoram, India. It is located in Champhai R.D Bloock, 86 km North of the district capital Champhai.

Demographics 
According to the 2011 census of India, Vaikhawtlang has 168 households. The effective literacy rate (i.e. the literacy rate of population excluding children aged 6 and below) is 94.29%.

References 

Villages in Champhai block